General Carrera Province is one of four provinces of the southern Chilean region of Aisen (XI). Its capital city is Chile Chico.

Administration
As a province, General Carrera is a second-level administrative division, governed by a provincial governor appointed by the president. The province comprises two communes, Río Ibáñez and Chile Chico; each is governed by a municipality, headed by an alcalde.

Geography and demography
It is the sixth least populated province in the country. Of these, 3,042 (44%) lived in urban areas and 3,879 (56%) in rural areas, according to the 2002 census.

Between the 1992 and 2002 censuses, the population grew by 6% (392 persons) while, between the 2002 and 2017 ones, it grew by 9.2% (610 persons).

References

Provinces of Aysén Region
Provinces of Chile